BAP Río Chira (PC 12) is a motor gunboat in the Peruvian Coast Guard. She was built under American influence at SIMA Callao Shipyard and laid down initially as PGM-111. She was transferred to the Peruvian Coast Guard in 1975 and reclassified PM-223.

References

 

Gunboats of the United States Navy
Ships transferred from the United States Navy to the Peruvian Navy
1972 ships
Ships of the Peruvian Coast Guard
Ships built in Peru